Brubeck in Amsterdam is a 1962 live album by Dave Brubeck and his quartet recorded on 3 December at the Concertgebouw in Amsterdam, though unreleased until 1969. Six of the tracks are from Brubeck's musical The Real Ambassadors.

Reception

Scott Yanow reviewed the album for Allmusic and wrote that Brubeck and his quartet "...seem inspired during this concert by the fresh material, making this hard-to-find album a bit of a collector's item."

Track listing 
All compositions by Dave Brubeck, lyricists indicated:
 "Since Love Had Its Way" (Iola Brubeck) - 5:57
 "King for a Day" (I. Brubeck)- 3:00
 "The Real Ambassador" (I. Brubeck) - 6:31
 "They Say I Look Like God" (I. Brubeck) - 4:14
 "Dizzy Ditty" - 2:50
 "Cultural Exchange" (I. Brubeck) - 5:57
 "Good Reviews" (I. Brubeck)- 3:55
 "Brandenburg Gate" - 11:55

Personnel 
 Dave Brubeck - piano, producer
 Paul Desmond - alto saxophone
 Eugene Wright - double bass
 Joe Morello - drums

References

1963 live albums
Columbia Records live albums
Dave Brubeck live albums
Live instrumental albums
1962 in the Netherlands